Droideka may refer to:

 Droideka (Star Wars), a type of battle droid in Star Wars
 Droideka (born 1990), a British music producer